The Long Island Forensic Association is a non-profit organization which direct high school competitive speech events.  It is affiliated with the New York State Forensics League.

LIFA is a daughter league of the New York State Forensics League (NYSFL).

It is co-affiliated with the Long Island chapter of the National Catholic Forensic League (CFL).

The word "forensic" is an adjective meaning "of public debate or argument." The word is derived from the Latin word forensis, meaning "of the forum." The sense of the word "forensic" that means "pertaining to legal trials" dates from the 17th century (Oxford English Dictionary) and led to the use of the word "forensics" in reference to legal evidence.

Events
Each year, LIFA hosts speech, congress, and debate tournaments for honors in a wide variety of events which may lead to qualification for the New York State Championship tournament. These events include:
 Lincoln-Douglas Debate (LD)
 Public Forum Debate (PFD) (Ted Turner Debate)
 Foreign Extemporaneous Speaking (FX or IX)
 Domestic Extemporaneous Speaking (DX or USX)
 Original Oratory (OO)
 Dramatic Interpretation (DI)
 Humorous Interpretation (HI)
 Duo Interpretation (DUO)
 Student Congress (Congress)

See also
 New York State Forensics League (NYSFL) 
 National Catholic Forensic League

External links
LIFA Website LIFA Website
 Official Website Website of the National Forensic League
 The Rostrum The NFL's official magazine
 Archive of Rostrum articles from the University of Vermont's Debate Central.
 NFL District Standings The Annual School standings within Each District of the National Forensic League.
 National Forensic League Manual National Forensic League Manual, that explains every aspect of the Organization.
 National Tournament Manual The Manual of the National Tournament, which covers all information regarding the Tournament.
 District Tournament Manual Information and Procedures involving the process of the District Tournament.

Student debating societies
Organizations based in New York (state)